Robert Schofield (7 November 1904 – 1978) was an English footballer who played as an inside forward for Rochdale, Halifax Town and Accrington Stanley.

References

Rochdale A.F.C. players
Halifax Town A.F.C. players
Accrington Stanley F.C. (1891) players
Ashton National F.C. players
Bacup Borough F.C. players
Rossendale United F.C. players
Footballers from Rochdale
English footballers
1904 births
1978 deaths
Association footballers not categorized by position